is a Japanese light novel series written by Kennoji. It was serialized online between 2016 and 2020 on the user-generated novel publishing website Shōsetsuka ni Narō. It was acquired by Linda Publishers, who have originally published two volumes with illustrations by Shōji Nigō between February and June 2017 under their Red Rising Books imprint, before going bankrupt. Hifumi Shobō later reacquired the series, who have published seven volumes with illustrations by Matsuuni since April 2018 under their Brave Novel imprint. A manga adaptation with art by Eri Haruno has been serialized online via Takeshobo's Web Comic Gamma Plus website since December 2018. Both the light novel and manga are licensed in North America by Seven Seas Entertainment. An anime television series adaptation by EMT Squared aired from July to September 2021.

Characters

Previously a 24-year old office worker, he was transported to another world and becomes the manager of a drugstore to put his medicinal alchemist skills to use. 

A child-like werewolf who lives with Reiji. She usually takes on a human form. She treats Reiji as her Master after he healed her.

The ghost who resides in the house where Kirio Drugstore is now open, haunting the house a century after her death, as she died young because of her sickness. She now can go out due to a brooch given to her. Her house was also seen with clothing materials in the cellar, revealing that her mother used to sew clothes when they were alive. 

Daughter of the town Lord and Lady Flam. She has a superiority complex and an interest in Reiji. Called Makimaki (Twirls) by Noela. 

Leader of the Red Cat Brigade, a mercenary group that was hired to defend the town. 

The Demon Lord on the world Reiji transported to. Fell in love with Noela, who rejected his advances. Became a part-time drugstore employee to learn Reiji's craft. 
Vivi

A Spirit living in the lake where Mina loved to go when she was living. Easily melts when too hot, so she needs the cooling gel Reiji made. She became a part-timer in the drugstore.
Micott

Regular customer of the drugstore.
Zeral Alonzo

One of the rich nobles of the town. Reiji helped him calm the nerves of his yandere girlfriend. Gives a patch of his land for Reiji to plant his medicinal plants. 
Feris

Zeral's girlfriend. A worrywart and a yandere, she usually snaps whenever Zeral had contact with women.
Kururu

An Elf man. He was seen as events host. A definite homosexual, he has interest on Reiji. Brother of Ririka. 
Ririka

Kururu's little sister. She approached Reiji to help her win an archery contest with a beast lure and short bow. She fell in love with Reiji. 
Doz and Moz

Red Cat Brigade members.
Paula

The town's blacksmith. She goes to Reiji's drugstore both for his medicines and to occasionally eat there.

 The personal assistant to Ejiru. He goes off to find Ejiru after Ejiru got a part-time job at the drugstore.

Media

Light novels
The series was written by Kennoji and serialized online between 2016 and 2020 on the user-generated novel publishing website Shōsetsuka ni Narō. It was later acquired by Linda Publishers, who have originally published two volumes with illustrations by Shōji Nigō between February and June 2017 under their Red Rising Books imprint, before going bankrupt. Hifumi Shobō later reacquired the series, who have published seven volumes with illustrations by Matsuuni since April 2018 under their Brave Novel imprint. The Brave Novel edition of light novel series is licensed in North America by Seven Seas Entertainment.

Red Rising Books

Brave Novel

Manga
A manga adaptation with art by Eri Haruno has been serialized online via Takeshobo's Web Comic Gamma Plus website since December 2018 and has been collected in seven tankōbon volumes. The manga series is also licensed in North America by Seven Seas Entertainment.

Anime
An anime adaptation was announced by Hifumi Shobō at Comiket 97 on December 28, 2019, later revealed to be a television series on May 25, 2020. The series is animated by EMT Squared and directed by Masafumi Satō, with Hiroko Kanasugi overseeing the series' scripts, Etsuko Sumimoto designing the characters, and Tomoki Kikuya composing the series' music. Muse Communication licensed the series in South and Southeast Asia. It aired from July 7 to September 22, 2021 on Tokyo MX, BS11, and AT-X. Akane Kumada performed the series' opening theme song "Kokoro Hayaru", while Jun Fukushima, Risae Matsuda, and Kumada performed the series' ending theme song "Mainichi Kashimashi Pharmacy". Crunchyroll licensed the series outside of Asia.

It was the first time for Risae and Satsumi Matsuda, who are twin sisters, to play main roles which are not related by blood.

Episode list

Reception
Anime News Network's review of the first novel gave it a score of 3/5 stars, stating: "There is a lovely straightforward quality to the writing and the story that lets us know that Kennoji isn't winking and nudging towards any deeper plan, but it really is, on the whole, kind of boring. But it's a pleasant boring, and there's definitely something to be said for that."

Rebecca Silverman of Anime News Network gave the first episode of the anime a score of 2/5 stars, criticizing it for omitting some details from the novel, but praised the visuals for Noela. She described the series as being "just okay, and mostly it reminds me that I wish it was Kennoji's other title, Hazure Skill, that got the anime series."

Notes

References

External links
  at Shōsetsuka ni Narō 
  
  
  
 

2017 Japanese novels
2018 Japanese novels
2021 anime television series debuts
Anime and manga based on light novels
Crunchyroll anime
EMT Squared
Isekai anime and manga
Isekai novels and light novels
Japanese webcomics
Light novels
Light novels first published online
Muse Communication
Seinen manga
Seven Seas Entertainment titles
Slice of life anime and manga
Shōsetsuka ni Narō
Takeshobo manga
Webcomics in print